TORM based in Copenhagen, Denmark, is a shipping company that owns and operates product tankers.  The Company's product tankers carry refined oil products such as gasoline, jet fuel, naphtha and diesel oil.

History 
Torm was founded by Ditlev Torm and Christian Schmiegelow in 1889. The company was listed on the Copenhagen Stock Exchange in 1905. Today, TORM is listed on Nasdaq Copenhagen and NASDAQ in New York.

Operations 
The company was formerly composed of tanker and bulk carrier divisions with product tanker activity accounting for the majority of the business.  The last two bulk carriers were divested in 2015.

TORM is one of the leading tanker carriers of clean oil products such as gasoline, jet fuel, naphtha and diesel oil and other clean products.

The company operates approximately 80 vessels.

On 8 June 2007, A/S Dampskibsselskabet TORM (TORM) announced that TORM and TeekayCorporation (TEEKAY) had completed the acquisition of OMI Corporation (OMI), whereby OMI became a jointly owned subsidiary of TORM and TEEKAY.  TORM will consequently with effect from 1 August 2007 take over 24 product tankers from OMI, leaving TORM's fleet at 85 vessels excluding new builds. TORM will also take over OMI's technical operations in India and a part of OMI's organisation in the US.

References

Further reading
 Johannesen, Ole Stig: Tormbådene, Skibene gennem 120 år fra rederikoncernen Torm

External links 
 

Shipping companies of Denmark
Shipping companies based in Copenhagen
Danish companies established in 1889
Companies based in Gentofte Municipality